The Men's 1 m springboard competition of the 2020 European Aquatics Championships was held on 12 May 2021.

Results
The preliminary round was started at 12:00. The final was held at 20:40.

Green denotes finalists

References

Men's 1 m springboard